Gumani is a community in Tamale Metropolitan District in the Northern Region of Ghana. It has a linear settlement with roads constructed within the community linking it to the Tamale-Bolgatanga trunk road. It is a populated community.

See also
Suburbs of Tamale, Ghana

References 

Populated places in the Northern Region (Ghana)
Communities in Ghana
Suburbs of Tamale, Ghana